Mohamed Eldib (born 7 January 1979) is an Egyptian powerlifter. At the 2012 Summer Paralympics he won gold at the -100 kg category, with the new world record (249 kg).

References 

Paralympic gold medalists for Egypt
Paralympic powerlifters of Egypt
Powerlifters at the 2012 Summer Paralympics
1979 births
Living people
Medalists at the 2012 Summer Paralympics
African Games gold medalists for Egypt
African Games medalists in weightlifting
Competitors at the 2015 African Games
Paralympic medalists in powerlifting
20th-century Egyptian people
21st-century Egyptian people